Hassan Al-Traidi (Arabic: حسن الطريدي; born 8 September 1989) is a football (soccer) player who plays for Al Safa as a defender.

He played in the Saudi Professional League for Al-Khaleej.

External links
 

Saudi Arabian footballers
Khaleej FC players
Al-Nahda Club (Saudi Arabia) players
Hajer FC players
Al Safa FC players
1989 births
Living people
Saudi First Division League players
Saudi Fourth Division players
Saudi Professional League players
Saudi Second Division players
Association football defenders
Saudi Arabian Shia Muslims